Buried Alive (Italian: La sepolta viva) is a 1949 Italian historical melodrama film directed by Guido Brignone and starring Milly Vitale, Paul Muller and Evi Maltagliati. It is based on the novel of the same title by Francesco Mastriani, set during the campaign for Italian unification.

It was shot at the Cinecittà Studios in Rome. The film's sets were designed by the art director Ivo Battelli.

Cast 
 Milly Vitale as Eva
 Paul Muller as Federico
 Evi Maltagliati as Elisa
 Tina Lattanzi as Elena
 Piero Palermini as Giorgio
 Carlo Tamberlani as Conte Capecci
 Enzo Fiermonte as Bruno
 Luigi Garrone as Silvestro
 Cesare Polacco as Ferdinando
 Eddie Rodd as himself
 Ben Rodd as himself

References

Bibliography 
 Bayman, Louis. The Operatic and the Everyday in Postwar Italian Film Melodrama. Edinburgh University Press, 2014.

External links 
 
 Buried Alive at Variety Distribution

1949 films
Italian historical drama films
1940s historical drama films
1940s Italian-language films
Films directed by Guido Brignone
Films shot at Cinecittà Studios
Films set in the 1860s
Melodrama films
1949 drama films
1940s Italian films